The fourth season of the television series Ally McBeal commenced airing in the United States on October 12, 2000, concluded on May 21, 2001, and consisted of 23 episodes. The entire season originally aired Mondays at 9pm, just like the seasons before.

It was released on DVD as a six disc boxed set under the title of Ally McBeal: Season Four on February 10, 2002, and this was the very first season of Ally McBeal to be released on DVD.

The fourth season had an average rating of 12.0 million viewers in the United States and was ranked #40 on the complete ranking sheet of all the year's shows. This was the third highest rated season of Ally McBeal.

On the 53rd Primetime Emmy Awards, the show won its final two Emmys in the categories of Outstanding Casting for a Comedy Series for the work of Nikki Valko and Ken Miller, and in the category of Outstanding Supporting Actor in a Comedy Series, for Peter MacNicol's portrayal of John Cage.  On the 58th Golden Globe Awards, Robert Downey, Jr. won an award for his portrayal of Larry Paul and got a standing ovation as he approached the stage.

Crew
The season was produced by 20th Television and David E. Kelley Productions. The executive producers were Bill D'Elia and the creator David E. Kelley, who also wrote all 23 episodes just like the seasons before. Staff writers Alicia Martin, Barb Mackintosh, Melissa Rosenberg, Kerry Lenhart and John J. Sakmar each co-wrote one episode with Kelley. Alice West served as the co-executive producer.

Cast
The fourth season had nine major roles receive star billing. Calista Flockhart as Ally McBeal, Greg Germann as Richard Fish, Peter MacNicol as John Cage, Jane Krakowski as Elaine Vassal, Lisa Nicole Carson as Renée Raddick, Vonda Shepard as herself, Portia de Rossi as Nelle Porter and Lucy Liu as Ling Woo all returned to the main cast.

Robert Downey, Jr. was added as a new character named Larry Paul and served as Ally's love interest during the season, but due to the actor's problem with drug addiction, he was written out. The show's season finale was titled The Wedding and was originally going to include Ally's and Larry's wedding. The fifth season had already been planned out, revolving around the characters' married life, and had to be rewritten.

Former castmember Courtney Thorne-Smith returned to guest star on episode Girls' Night Out, where she reunited with Marcia Cross, with whom she worked together on Melrose Place. James LeGros was upgraded to contract status after recurring the previous season, but his character was slowly phased out during the season and written out by the end of it. Lisa Nicole Carson, an original cast member, announced in June 2001 that she would not return for the next season either.

Various supporting characters from the previous seasons returned to reprise their recurring roles, including Albert Hall as Judge Seymore Walsh, Jennifer Holliday as Lisa Knowles, Harrison Page as Reverend Mark Newman, and Renée Elise Goldsberry, Vatrena King and Sy Smith as the backup singers for Vonda Shepard. Taye Diggs appeared as recurring character Jackson Duper and was intended to return as a regular in the following season, but he wasn't picked up. Anne Heche signed on to play John's love interest Melanie; Lisa Edelstein appeared as Mark's love interest Cindy; Josh Groban appeared as a troubled teenager, Malcolm Wyatt; John Michael Higgins appeared as Steven Miler, Ally's therapist.

This season also featured special guest stars Chubby Checker, Sting and Anastacia.

Episodes

References

External links
 Ally McBeal Episode List at IMDb.com

2000 American television seasons
2001 American television seasons
Ally McBeal